Sir Charles Bracewell-Smith, 4th Baronet was born in October 1955 and educated at Harrow School. He is the founder of the Homestead Charitable Trust and author of "The Song of the Saints". He is a grandson of Bracewell Smith and son of George Bracewell Smith. He succeeded to the baronetcy after the death of his brother Guy Bracewell Smith in 1983 at the age of 30. Bracewell-Smith married Carol Hough in 1977; Hough died in July 1994. He subsequently remarried, in 1996, to Nina Kakkar. He has no children.

Bracewell-Smith, along with cousins Richard Carr and Clive Carr, inherited major shareholdings in Arsenal Football Club from their grandfather Sir Bracewell Smith; Sir Charles transferred his shares to his wife who is now a non-executive director of the club.

Sir Charles and his wife were ranked 834th equal in the Sunday Times Rich List 2007 with an estimated family fortune of £80m.

References

1955 births
Living people
People educated at Harrow School
Baronets in the Baronetage of the United Kingdom